Nirvana is a Bucky Pizzarelli studio album of jazz standards. Also on the album is his son, the jazz guitarist John Pizzarelli.

Track listing
Azurte
Sing, Sing, Sing
A Little World Called Home
Pick yourself Up
Nuages
Honeysuckle Rose
Willow Weep for Me
Tangerine
It's Been A Long Time/Don't Take Your Love From Me 
Two Funky People 
Come Rain Or Come Shine
Stompin' At The Savoy

Personnel
Bucky Pizzarelliguitar
John Pizzarelliguitar
Lynn Seatondouble-bass
Bernard Purdiedrums

References

1995 albums
Bucky Pizzarelli albums
John Pizzarelli albums